This is a list of high schools in the state of Maine.

Androscoggin County

 Lisbon High School, Lisbon Falls
 Oak Hill High School, Wales
 Poland Regional High School, Poland

Auburn

 Edward Little High School
 St. Dominic Academy

Lewiston

 Lewiston High School
 Lewiston Regional Technical Center

Turner

 Leavitt Area High School
Calvary Christian Academy

Aroostook County

 Ashland District School, Ashland
 Central Aroostook High School, Mars Hill
 Easton Senior High School, Easton
 Fort Fairfield Middle/High School, Fort Fairfield
 Fort Kent Community High School, Fort Kent
 Hodgdon High School, Hodgdon
 Madawaska High School, Madawaska
 Maine School of Science and Mathematics, Limestone
 Presque Isle High School, Presque Isle
 Southern Aroostook Community School, Dyer Brook
 St. John Valley Technology Center, Frenchville
 Van Buren District High School, Van Buren
 Washburn District High School, Washburn
 Wisdom High School, St. Agatha

Caribou

 Caribou High School
 Caribou Technology Center

Houlton

 Greater Houlton Christian Academy
 Houlton High School
Region Two School of Applied Technology

Cumberland County

 Baxter Academy for Technology and Sciences, Portland
 Bridgton Academy, Bridgton
 Brunswick High School, Brunswick
 Bonny Eagle High School, Standish
 Cape Elizabeth High School, Cape Elizabeth
 Casco Bay High School, Portland
 Cheverus High School, Portland
 Deering High School, Portland
 Falmouth High School, Falmouth
 Freeport High School, Freeport
 Gorham High School, Gorham
 Gray-New Gloucester High School, Gray
 Greely High School, Cumberland
 Harpswell Coastal Academy, Harpswell
 Lake Region High School , Naples
 Lake Region Vocational Center, Naples
 Pine Tree Academy, Freeport
 Portland Arts & Technology High School, Portland
 Portland High School, Portland
 Region 10 Technical High School, Brunswick
 Scarborough High School, Scarborough
 South Portland High School, South Portland
 Waynflete School, Portland
 Westbrook High School, Westbrook
 Westbrook Regional Vocational Center, Westbrook
 Windham High School, Windham
 Yarmouth High School, Yarmouth

Franklin County

 Foster Career and Technical Education Center, Farmington
 Mount Abram Regional High School, Strong
 Mount Blue High School, Farmington
 Rangeley Lakes Regional High School, Rangeley
 Spruce Mountain High School, Jay

Hancock County

 Bucksport High School, Bucksport
 Deer Isle-Stonington High School, Deer Isle
 Ellsworth High School, Ellsworth
 George Stevens Academy, Blue Hill
 Hancock County Technical Center, Ellsworth
 Mount Desert Island High School, Bar Harbor
 Sumner Memorial High School, Sullivan

Kennebec County

 Capital Area Technical Center, Augusta
 Cony High School, Augusta
 Erskine Academy, South China
 Gardiner Area High School, Gardiner
 Hall-Dale High School, Farmingdale
 Kents Hill School, Kents Hill
 Maranacook Community High School, Readfield
 Messalonskee High School, Oakland
 Monmouth Academy, Monmouth
 Waterville Senior High School, Waterville
 Winslow High School, Winslow
 Winthrop High School (Maine), Winthrop

Knox County

 Camden Hills Regional High School, Rockport
 Mid-Coast School of Technology, Rockland
 North Haven High School (Maine), North Haven
 Oceanside High School (Maine), Rockland
 Vinalhaven High School, Vinalhaven

Lincoln County

 Boothbay Region High School, Boothbay Harbor
 Lincoln Academy, Newcastle
 Medomak Valley High School, Waldoboro
 Wiscasset High School, Wiscasset

Oxford County

 Buckfield Senior High School, Buckfield
 Dirigo High School, Dixfield
 Fryeburg Academy, Fryeburg
 Gould Academy, Bethel
 Hebron Academy, Hebron
 Mountain Valley High School, Rumford
 Oxford Hills Comprehensive High School, South Paris
 Oxford Hills Technical School, Oxford
 Region 9 School of Applied Technology, Mexico
 Sacopee Valley High School, Hiram
 Telstar High School, Bethel

Penobscot County

 Bangor Christian High School, Bangor
 Bangor High School, Bangor
 Brewer High School, Brewer
 Central High School, Corinth
 Dexter Regional High School, Dexter
 Hampden Academy, Hampden
 Hermon High School, Hermon
 John Bapst Memorial High School, Bangor
 Katahdin High School, Stacyville
 Lee Academy, Lee
 Mattanawcook Academy, Lincoln
 Northern Penobscot Tech. Region 3, Lincoln
 Nokomis Regional High School, Newport
 Old Town High School, Old Town
 Orono High School, Orono
 Penobscot Valley High School, Howland
 Schenck High School, East Millinocket
 Stearns High School, Millinocket
 Tri-County Technical Center, Dexter
 United Technologies Center, Bangor

Piscataquis County

 Foxcroft Academy, Dover-Foxcroft
 Greenville High School, Greenville
 Piscataquis Community High School, Guilford
 Penquis Valley High School, Milo

Sagadahoc County

 Bath Regional Career and Technical Center, Bath
 Hyde School, Bath
 Morse High School, Bath
 Mount Ararat High School, Topsham
 Richmond High School (Maine), Richmond

Somerset County

 Carrabec High School, North Anson
 Forest Hills High School (Maine), Jackman
 Lawrence High School, Fairfield
 Madison Area Memorial High School, Madison
 Maine Central Institute, Pittsfield
 Skowhegan Area High School, Skowhegan
 Somerset Career and Technical Center, Skowhegan
 Upper Kennebec Valley Memorial High School, Bingham

Waldo County

 Belfast Area High School, Belfast
 Islesboro High School, Isleboro
 Mount View High School, Thorndike
 Searsport District High School, Searsport
 Waldo County Technical Center, Belfast

Washington County

 Calais Middle High School, Calais
 Coastal Washington County Institute of Technology, Machias
 East Grand High School, Danforth
 Jonesport-Beals High School, Jonesport
 Machias Memorial High School, Machias
 Narraguagus High School, Harrington
 Shead High School, Eastport
 St. Croix Regional Technical Center, Calais
 Washington Academy, East Machias
 Woodland Senior High School, Baileyville

York County

 Berwick Academy, South Berwick
 Biddeford High School, Biddeford
 Biddeford Regional Center of Technology, Biddeford
 Kennebunk High School, Kennebunk
 Marshwood High School, South Berwick
 Massabesic High School, Waterboro
 Noble High School, North Berwick
 Old Orchard Beach High School, Old Orchard Beach
 Robert William Traip Academy, Kittery
 Sanford Christian Academy, Sanford
 Sanford High School, Sanford
 Sanford Regional Technical Center, Sanford
 Thornton Academy, Saco
 Wells High School, Wells
 York High School, York

See also 
List of school districts in Maine

References

External links 
List of high schools in Maine from SchoolTree.org

Maine
Schools